Glacier morphology, or the form a glacier takes, is influenced by temperature, precipitation, topography, and other factors. The goal of glacial morphology is to gain a better understanding of glaciated landscapes and the way they are shaped. Types of glaciers can range from massive ice sheets, such as the Greenland ice sheet, to small cirque glaciers found perched on mountain tops. Glaciers can be grouped into two main categories:

 Ice flow is constrained by the underlying bedrock topography
 Ice flow is unrestricted by surrounding topography

Unconstrained Glaciers

Ice sheets and ice caps
Ice sheets and ice caps cover the largest areas of land in comparison to other glaciers, and their ice is unconstrained by the underlying topography. They are the largest glacial ice formations and hold the vast majority of the world's fresh water.

Ice sheets 
Ice sheets are the largest form of glacial formation. They are dome shaped, and similarly to ice caps, exhibit radial flow. As ice sheets expand over the ocean, they become ice shelves. Ice sheets contain 99% of all the freshwater ice found on Earth, and form as layers of snow fall accumulate and slowly start to compact into ice. There are only two ice sheets present on Earth today, and they are the Antarctic ice sheet, and the Greenland ice sheet. Although only a tenth of modern Earth is covered by ice sheets, the Pleistocene epoch was characterized by ice sheets that covered a third of our land. This was also known as the Last Glacial Maximum.

Ice caps 
An ice cap can be defined as a dome shaped mass of ice that exhibits a radial flow. They are often easily confused with ice sheets, but these ice structures are smaller in size. They are smaller than 50,000 km2, and obscure the entirety of the topography they span. They mainly form in polar and sub-polar regions that can be characterized by having particularly high elevation but flat ground. Ice caps come in a variety of shapes; they can be round, circular, or irregular in shape. Oftentimes, ice caps gradually merge into ice sheets making them difficult to track and document. Some examples of ice caps include:

 Jostedal Glacier, Norway
 Devon Ice Cap, Canada
 Barnes Ice Cap, Canada
 Vatnajökull, Iceland
 Flade Isblink, Greenland

Ice domes 
An ice dome is a part of an ice cap or ice sheet that is characterized by upstanding ice surface located in the accumulation zone. Ice domes are nearly symmetrical, with a convex or parabolic surface shape. They tend to develop evenly over a land mass that may be either a topographic height or a depression—often reflecting the sub-glacial topography. In ice sheets, domes may reach a thickness that may exceed . However, in ice caps, the thickness of the dome is much smaller; measuring roughly up to several hundred metres in comparison. In glaciated islands, ice domes are usually the highest point of the ice cap. An example of an ice dome is Kupol Vostok Pervyy in Alger Island, Franz Josef Land, Russia.

Ice streams 
Ice streams rapidly channel ice flow out to the sea, ocean, or an ice shelf. For this reason, they are commonly referred to as the "arteries" of an ice sheet. Ice from continental sheets is drained into the ocean by a complex network of ice streams, and their activity is greatly affected by oceanic and atmospheric processes. They feature a higher velocity in the centre of the stream, and are bounded by slow moving ice on either side. Periods of greater ice stream flow result in more ice transfer from ice sheets to the ocean; subsequently impacting sea level by raising it. At the margin between glacial ice and water, ice calving takes place as glaciers begin to fracture, and icebergs break off from the large masses of ice. Iceberg calving is a major contributor to sea level rise, but the ocean is not the only place that can experience ice calving. Calving can also take place in lakes, fjords, and continental ice cliffs.

Constrained Glaciers

Icefields 

An icefield is an example of glacier structure that covers a relatively large area, and is usually located in areas characterized by mountain terrain. Icefields are quite similar to ice caps; however, their morphology is much more influenced by the underlying mountainous topography.

The rock formations found under the icefields are variable, and rocky mountain peaks known as nunataks tend to jut out from under the surface of icefields. Some examples of icefields include:

 Columbia Icefield, Canada
 Juneau Icefield, Canada
 Southern Patagonian Ice Field, Chile & Argentina
 Harding Icefield, USA

Outlet glaciers
Outlet glaciers are often found in valleys, and they originate from major ice sheets and ice caps. They move in a singular direction that is determined by the underlying landscape. Outlet glaciers drain inland glaciers through gaps found in the surrounding topography. A higher amount of inland glacial melt ultimately increases the amount of outlet glacier output. Studies predict that outlet glaciers found in Greenland can increase the global sea level considerably following an increase in global temperature, and a subsequently higher drainage output. Some examples of outlet glaciers include:

 Helheim Glacier, Greenland
 Kangerlussuaq Glacier, Greenland
 Jakobshavn Glacier, Greenland
 Petermann Glacier, Greenland

Valley glaciers

Valley glaciers are outlet glaciers that provide drainage for ice fields, icecaps or ice sheets. The flow of these glaciers is confined by the walls of the valley they are found in; but they may also form in mountain ranges as gathering snow turns to ice. The formation of valley glaciers is restricted by formations such as terminal moraines, which are collections of unconsolidated rock material, or till deposited by the terminus of the glacier. Ice-free exposed bedrock and slopes often surround valley glaciers, providing a route for snow and ice to accumulate on the glacier via avalanches. Some examples of valley glaciers include:

 Sermilik Glacier, Canada
 Fláajökull, Iceland

Valley-head glaciers 
Valley head glaciers are types of valley glaciers that are only limited to the valley head. An example of this type of valley glacier is Bægisárjökull, found in Iceland.

Fjords 
True fjords are formed when valley glaciers retreat and seawater fills the now empty valley. They can be found in mountainous, glaciation affected terrain. Some examples of fjords include:

 Hvalfjörður, Iceland
 Hornsund, Svalbard
 Sognefjord, Norway
 An existing valley glacier of this type is Jakobshavn Glacier in Greenland

Piedmont glaciers

Piedmont glaciers are a sub-type of valley glaciers which have flowed out onto lowland plains, where they spread out into a fan-like shape. Some examples of Piedmont glaciers include:

 Malaspina Glacier, USA
 Endeavor Piedmont Glacier, Antarctica

Cirque glaciers

Cirque glaciers are glaciers that appear in bowl shaped valley hollows. Snow easily settles in the topographic structure; it is turned to ice as more snow falls and is subsequently compressed. When the glacier melts, a cirque structure is left in its place. Some examples of cirque glaciers include:

 Lower Curtis Glacier, USA
 Eel Glacier, USA

Hanging glacier 
A hanging glacier is a form of glacier that appears in a hanging valley, and has the potential to break off from the side of the mountain it is attached to. As bits and pieces of hanging glaciers break off and begin to fall, avalanches can be triggered. Examples of hanging glaciers include:

 Eiger Glacier, Switzerland
 Angel Glacier, Canada

References

Sources

External links

Glaciology
Geomorphology